Molina Healthcare is a managed care company headquartered in Long Beach, California, United States. The company provides health insurance to individuals through government programs such as Medicaid and Medicare.

History
Molina Healthcare was founded in 1980 by C. David Molina, an emergency room physician in Long Beach, California. He had seen an influx of patients using the emergency room for common illnesses such as a sore throat or the flu because they were being turned away by doctors who would not accept Medi-Cal. Molina established his first primary care clinic with the goal of treating the lowest-income patients, regardless of their ability to pay.

In September 2020, Molina Healthcare entered into an arrangement to purchase approximately all the assets of the Affinity Health Plan for about $380 million.

Leadership
For twenty years, the company was run by Dr. Molina's son, J. Mario Molina, MD, a physician. He was the president and CEO of the company. John Molina, Mario's younger brother, was the CFO of Molina Healthcare. The two took over the Molina's operations after their father died in 1996 and continued to expand the company. In May 2017 J. Mario and John were removed from their positions by the Board of Directors, who cited poor financial performance as the reason for the change in leadership. In October 2017 the company announced Joseph M. Zubretsky, the former CFO of Aetna, as Molina Healthcare’s president and CEO.

Clinics
The first Molina Medical clinic was opened in Wilmington, California in 1980. The company formerly operated clinics in Washington, New Mexico, Florida and Utah. The clinics were opened to provide health care to low-income families and individuals. In August 2017 Molina Healthcare announced it would close several clinics in Michigan, Florida, New Mexico, Wisconsin, and Utah.

Becoming an HMO
Molina Healthcare has focused on government-paid health care programs such as SCHIP and Medicaid since it became a health maintenance organization in 1985. From 1985 to 1997, the company was only in California.

Expansion of health plans
 1997: Molina Healthcare acquires HealthReach Family Health Care and enters the states of Utah and Michigan.
 2000: Molina Healthcare enters the state of Washington. 
 2004: Molina Healthcare enters the state of New Mexico.
 2005: Molina Healthcare becomes a health plan in Ohio.
 2006: Molina Healthcare enters the state of Texas.
 2007: Molina Healthcare enters Missouri.
 2008: Molina Healthcare enters Florida.
 2010: Molina Healthcare enters Wisconsin.
 2012: Molina Healthcare enters Illinois.
 2013: Molina Healthcare enters South Carolina by acquiring assets from Community Health Solutions.
 2013: Molina Healthcare acquires New Mexico Lovelace Medicaid contract. 
 2014: Molina Healthcare acquires Florida Medicaid assets from First Coast Advantage.
 2015: Molina Healthcare enters Chicago market, acquiring MyCare Chicago's Medicaid assets.
 2015: Molina Healthcare enters Puerto Rico.
 2015: Molina Healthcare of Washington is the first health care company in the state to cover "Virtual Urgent Care" services.
 2015: Molina Healthcare acquires Medicaid assets of Integral Health Plan, Inc. in Florida.
 2015: Molina Healthcare acquires Providence Human Services and Community Services, now known as Pathways by Molina.
 2015: Molina Healthcare adds online access to behavioral health.
 2015: Molina Healthcare acquires HealthPlus MIChild and Medicaid programs of Michigan.
 2015: Molina Healthcare acquires assets of Loyola Physician Partners' Medicaid Program of Illinois.
 2017: Molina Healthcare exits the individual Marketplace in Utah and Wisconsin.
2018: Molina Healthcare loses Medicaid contract with the state of New Mexico.
2019: Molina Healthcare loses Medicaid contract with the state of Texas.
2020: Molina Healthcare acquires Passport Health Plan in Kentucky.
2021: Molina Healthcare acquires Magellan Complete Care line of business from Magellan Health, Inc.
2021: Molina Healthcare acquires Affinity Health Plan in New York.
2021: Molina Healthcare acquires Cigna's Medicaid contracts in Texas

Going public
Molina Healthcare filed with the Securities and Exchange Commission for an initial stock offering in December 2002 and went public in July 2003 with a stock offering of $102 million. The shares were priced at $17.50, and Molina raised approximately $124 million in the initial public offering. In its stock market debut, Molina sold 6.6 million shares at $20.30, making the company the third-best first day gainer of 2003. Molina Healthcare was the first company from Inc. Magazines "Inner City 100" list to go public.

Entering the Medicare market
Molina Healthcare entered the Medicare market in 2006. The company currently offers Medicare health plan options in: California, Florida, Idaho, Illinois, Michigan, Ohio, South Carolina, Texas, Utah, Virginia, Washington and Wisconsin.

Entering MMIS market
Molina Healthcare acquired Unisys’ health information management business in December 2010 to create Molina Medicaid Solutions (MMS). MMS has Medicaid Management Information Systems (MMIS) contracts with Idaho, Louisiana, Maine, New Jersey, West Virginia and the U.S. Virgin Islands. In Autumn 2018, Molina Healthcare, Inc. sold its Medicaid management information systems business, Molina Medicaid Solutions (MMS), to DXC Technology. MMS was a wholly owned subsidiary of Molina Healthcare at the time of sale.

Entering health insurance marketplace
In 2014, Molina Healthcare began offering Marketplace plans in nine states where it offered Medicaid health plans through State Facilitated Marketplaces and Federally Facilitated Marketplace. On November 16, 2016 the Seattle Times reported that about 11 million people currently get their coverage through the exchange. In August 2017 Molina announced it would stop offering plans on the health insurance marketplaces in Utah, Wisconsin, and Maine in 2018.

Dual eligible demonstration projects
Molina was selected to participate in dual eligible demonstration projects in California, Ohio, Illinois, Michigan, South Carolina and Texas to serve patients who are eligible for both Medicare and Medicaid.

Philanthropy
In May 2022, MolincaCares presented a $100,000 grant to support Compass Health’s Broadway Campus Redevelopment Project. The grant will aid to fund construction of a 72,000 square-foot, state-of-the-are facility that will expand community-based behavioural health care services and its workforce in northwest Washington.

Awards and recognition
Molina Healthcare was awarded the 2011 Alfred P. Sloan Award for Business Excellence in Workplace Flexibility. The award ranked Molina Healthcare in the top 20 percent of employers nationally in terms of its programs, policies and culture for creating an effective and flexible workplace. In 2006, Molina Healthcare was named among the 100 best corporate citizens by Business Ethics magazine. In 2005, Time magazine recognized Dr. J. Mario Molina, then CEO of Molina Healthcare, as one of the 25 most influential Hispanics in America.

The company ranked 155th on the 2021 Fortune 500 list of the largest United States corporations by revenue.

Other awards and recognition
 2012: Molina Healthcare of Ohio received Corporate Caring Award from Columbus Business First
 2012: Molina Healthcare of Ohio awarded Best Places to Work Award from Columbus Business First
 2013: Molina Healthcare of Ohio awarded Ohio Association of Health Plans Pinnacle Award
 2013: Molina Healthcare of Ohio awarded Padrino Award from the Ohio Hispanic Coalition
 2014: Milwaukee Journal Sentinel Recognizes Molina Healthcare of Wisconsin with a Top Workplace Award 2014
 2014: Molina Healthcare of New Mexico voted Best Places to Work by Albuquerque Business First
 2014: Molina Healthcare of Utah voted among Top Workplaces by the Salt Lake Tribune
 2014: Molina Healthcare of Ohio received Medical Mutual Pillar Award for Community Service
 2014: Molina Healthcare of Wisconsin became Partner to CDC National Diabetes Prevention Program Partner
 2014: Molina Healthcare, Inc. was one of 26 companies to participate in President Obama’s SupplierPay 2014
 2015: Molina Healthcare of Texas ranked #3 Medicaid health plan in Texas by NCQA
 2015: Molina Healthcare of California ranked #1 Medicaid health plan in California by NCQA
 2015: Molina Healthcare of Utah ranked #1 Medicaid health plan in Utah by NCQA
 2015: Molina Healthcare of Washington ranked #1 Medicaid Health Plan in Washington by NCQA
 2015: Molina Healthcare of Ohio ranked #2 Medicaid health plan in Ohio by NCQA
 2015: Molina Healthcare of New Mexico ranked #1 Medicaid health plan in New Mexico by NCQA
 2015: Molina Healthcare of Wisconsin voted Top Workplaces by the Milwaukee Journal Sentinel
 2015: Molina Healthcare, Inc. voted Top Ten Least Stressful Companies to Work for In America 2015
 2015: Molina Healthcare, Inc. ranked 301 in top Fortune 500 2015
 2015: Molina Healthcare of New Mexico awarded the New Mexico Performance Excellence Pinon Recognition
 2016: Molina Healthcare, Inc. ranked 201 in top Fortune 500 2016
 2017: Molina Healthcare, Inc. ranked 156 in Fortune 500 2017

References

External links

 

Companies listed on the New York Stock Exchange
Companies based in Long Beach, California
Health maintenance organizations
2003 initial public offerings